Eduardo Barbeiro (11 January 1932 – 17 April 2022) was a Portuguese breaststroke and backstroke swimmer. He competed in two swimming events and the water polo tournament at the 1952 Summer Olympics.

References

External links
 

1932 births
2022 deaths
Portuguese male backstroke swimmers
Portuguese male breaststroke swimmers
Portuguese male water polo players
Olympic swimmers of Portugal
Olympic water polo players of Portugal
Swimmers at the 1952 Summer Olympics
Water polo players at the 1952 Summer Olympics
People from Olhão
Sportspeople from Faro District
20th-century Portuguese people
21st-century Portuguese people